These are the results of the men's doubles competition in badminton at the 2008 Summer Olympics in Beijing.

The tournament consisted of a single-elimination tournament. Matches were played using a best-of-three games format. Games were played to 21 points, using rally scoring. Each game had to be won by a margin of two points, except when the game was won by a player who reached 30 even if the lead was only 1 at that point. 

The top four seeds in the tournament were placed in the bracket so as not to face each other until the semifinals. All other competitors were placed by draw.

Seeds
  (gold medalists)
  (silver medalists)
  (first round)
  (first round)

Draw
 

Men's doubles
Men's events at the 2008 Summer Olympics